Robert George Barlen (born July 27, 1980), best known as Bob Barlen, is a Canadian screenwriter and producer. He is best known for having co-written The Weinstein Company's animated film Escape from Planet Earth (2013), The Nut Job 2: Nutty by Nature (2017), and Nickelodeon's PAW Patrol: The Movie (2021), all are in collaboration with his business partner Cal Brunker, who served as the director for these films.

Career
Upon graduating from Ryerson University, Barlen attended the Directors' Lab at the Canadian Film Centre.

He co-wrote the screenplay for Escape from Planet Earth, which was released to theaters February 15, 2013.

Barlen produced and co-wrote the sequel The Nut Job 2: Nutty by Nature, starring Will Arnett, Maya Rudolph and Katherine Heigl, which was theatrically released by Open Road Films on August 11, 2017.

He co-wrote the screenplay for The Son of Bigfoot, a Belgian CGI-animated film, for nWave Pictures that was released in August 2017, and for Arctic Dogs, a Canadian CGI-animated feature film, for AMBI Pictures that was released in November 2019. His next screenplay work is Cranston Academy: Monster Zone, a Mexican-British-Canadian animated horror-comedy film starring Jamie Bell and Ruby Rose, which is produced by Ánima Estudios and Prime Focus World.

On 21 February 2020, following the announcement, Barlen confirmed via his Twitter that he's collaborating with Brunker once more as a co-writer, along with Billy Frolick, for PAW Patrol: The Movie, a film based on the popular Nick Jr. animated series, PAW Patrol. It was released on August 20, 2021, produced by Nickelodeon Movies and Spin Master, and distributed by Paramount Pictures.

Filmography

References

External links

Bob Barlen Biography
Bob Barlen Twitter

1980 births
Living people
Canadian male screenwriters
Toronto Metropolitan University alumni
Canadian Film Centre alumni
Writers from Kitchener, Ontario